This page provides supplementary chemical data on o-Xylene.

Material Safety Data Sheet  

The handling of this chemical may incur notable safety precautions. It is highly recommend that you seek the Material Safety Datasheet (MSDS) for this chemical from a reliable source such as eChemPortal, and follow its directions. MSDS is available from MATHESON TRI-GAS, INC. in the SDSdata.org database.

Structure and properties

Thermodynamic properties

Vapor pressure of liquid

Table data obtained from CRC Handbook of Chemistry and Physics 44th ed.

Distillation data
See also:
m-xylene (data page)
p-xylene (data page)

Spectral data

References

 

Xylene
Chemical data pages cleanup